The 1933–34 NHL season was the 17th season of the National Hockey League (NHL). Nine teams each played 48 games. The Chicago Black Hawks were the Stanley Cup winners as they beat the Detroit Red Wings three games to one.

League business

The New York Americans introduce new sweaters. The team's home uniform uses the word 'Americans' across the front with white stars over a blue area around the shoulders with red and white stripes below the wording. The road uniform is white with a shield logo. There are sleeves and shoulders are blue with a horizontal red stripe at the bottom of the sweater. The team is the second NHL team to have two sets of uniforms, after the Toronto Maple Leafs.

Regular season
The Ottawa Senators, having enough problems, now had to deal with holdout Cooney Weiland. He was sold to Detroit, strengthening the Red Wings. The Senators continued to lose, but won a few games when they signed an amateur named Max Kaminsky to centre the Roche brothers Desse and Earl. A defenceman, Ralph "Scotty" Bowman, gave Ottawa fans a little to cheer about. But the handwriting was on the wall, and in the last NHL game to be played in Ottawa until the NHL returned to that city in 1992, the Senators let the New York Americans use goaltender Alex Connell when Roy Worters was hurt. He helped the Americans beat his club.

A major trade was a swap of goaltenders as Lorne Chabot was traded to the Montreal Canadiens for George Hainsworth. The Canadiens also loaned Wilf Cude to Detroit and he led the
Red Wings to first place. Chabot did not do badly either, leading the Canadian Division in goaltending, helping the goal-strapped Canadiens to second place. Aurel Joliat of the Canadiens won the Hart Trophy.

Final standings

NHL All-Star Game

On February 14, 1934, the first NHL All-Star Game, albeit an unofficial one, was held to benefit Toronto Maple Leafs forward Ace Bailey, who suffered a career-ending injury. On December 12, 1933, near the end of the second period of a game between the Leafs and the Boston Bruins in the Boston Garden, Bailey was hit from behind by Bruins defenceman Eddie Shore, in retaliation for a check that Toronto defenceman King Clancy had delivered to Shore. Bailey was not the intended target of the check; Shore wanted to hit Clancy instead. Bailey was badly hurt, unconscious and bleeding. The Leafs' Red Horner took offence to the hit, and subsequently knocked out Shore with a punch. Shore was forgiven after the game when both players regained consciousness, with Bailey saying that it was "all part of the game." However, Bailey passed out and lapse into convulsions. Bailey was not expected to live after a single night in the hospital after suffering from severe hemorrhaging. It was made well known that Shore would have been charged with manslaughter were Bailey to die. He gradually recovered, but his hockey career was over. For his actions, Shore received a 16-game suspension, a third of the 48-game schedule of the time, while Horner was suspended for the remainder of the 1932–33 season.

The game itself was proposed by Walter Gilhooley, the sports editor of the Journal in Montreal. This proposal became a reality on January 24, 1934, in a meeting of the NHL's Board of Governors in 1934. The game was held at Maple Leaf Gardens in Toronto, during which Bailey's #6 uniform was retired by the Leafs. It was the first number to be retired in the NHL. The game saw the Leafs battle against an All-Star team made of players from the other eight teams, which the Leafs won 7–3. One of the more memorable moments before the game was when Bailey presented Shore with his All-Star jersey, showing to the public that Bailey had clearly forgiven him for his actions. Bailey also presented a trophy to NHL President Frank Calder before a game in the hope that the trophy would go to the winner of an annual All-Star Game for the benefit of injured players.

Playoffs

Playoff bracket

Quarterfinals

(A2) Chicago Black Hawks vs. (C2) Montreal Canadiens

(A3) New York Rangers vs. (C3) Montreal Maroons

Semifinals

(C1) Toronto Maple Leafs vs. (A1) Detroit Red Wings

(A2) Chicago Black Hawks vs. (C3) Montreal Maroons

Stanley Cup Finals

The Chicago Black Hawks beat the Detroit Red Wings three games to one with the fourth game going into double overtime. After regulation time in the fourth game, Black Hawks star goaltender and two-time Vezina Trophy winner, Charlie Gardiner, left the game because he wasn't feeling well. He died two months later of a brain hemorrhage.

Awards

All-Star teams

Player statistics

Scoring leaders
Note: GP = Games played, G = Goals, A = Assists, PTS = Points, PIM = Penalties in minutes

Source: NHL.

Leading goaltenders
Note: GP = Games played; Mins = Minutes played; GA = Goals against; SO = Shut outs; GAA = Goals against average

Source: NHL.

Coaches

American Division
Boston Bruins: Art Ross
Chicago Black Hawks: Tommy Gorman
Detroit Red Wings: Jack Adams
New York Rangers: Lester Patrick

Canadian Division
Montreal Canadiens: Newsy Lalonde
Montreal Maroons: Eddie Gerard
New York Americans: Bullet Joe Simpson
Ottawa Senators: George Boucher
Toronto Maple Leafs: Dick Irvin

Debuts
The following is a list of players of note who played their first NHL game in 1933–34 (listed with their first team, asterisk(*) marks debut in playoffs):
Russ Blinco, Montreal Maroons
Herb Cain, Montreal Maroons
Lorne Carr, New York Rangers
Flash Hollett, Toronto Maple Leafs

Last games
The following is a list of players of note that played their last game in the NHL in 1933–34 (listed with their last team):
Lionel Hitchman, Boston Bruins
Percy Galbraith, Boston Bruins
Charles Gardiner, Chicago Black Hawks
Clarence Abel, Chicago Black Hawks
George Hay, Detroit Red Wings
Ace Bailey, Toronto Maple Leafs

See also
National Hockey League All-Star Game
1933-34 NHL Transactions
List of Stanley Cup champions
1933 in sports
1934 in sports

References
 
 
 
 
 
 
Notes

External links
Hockeydb.com 1933–34 season
NHL.com
HickokSports.com

 
1933–34 in Canadian ice hockey by league
1933–34 in American ice hockey by league